Sandgate railway station is located on the Shorncliffe line in Queensland, Australia.  It serves the Brisbane suburb of Sandgate.

History
The railway line from Brisbane to Sandgate opened in 1882. The terminal station was located near Curlew Street, behind the Osbourne Hotel, and was named Sandgate. The line was extended to Shorncliffe in 1897 and the new terminal station was named Sandgate while the original terminus was renamed Sandgate Central. In 1911 Sandgate Central station was relocated to its present position, closer to the Post Office. When the former Sandgate station was renamed Shorncliffe in 1938, Sandgate Central was renamed simply Sandgate.

Services
Sandgate station is served by all stops Shorncliffe line services from Shorncliffe to Roma Street, Cannon Hill, Manly and Cleveland.

Services by platform

Transport links
Brisbane Transport operate two routes via Sandgate station:
326: Bracken Ridge to Toombul
335: to Brisbane City via Taigum
310 to Sandgate

Hornibrook Bus Lines operate two routes to and from Sandgate station:
690: to Redcliffe
691: to Redcliffe

References

External links

Sandgate station Queensland Rail
Sandgate station Queensland's Railways on the Internet
[ Sandgate station] TransLink travel information

Railway stations in Brisbane
Sandgate, Queensland
Railway stations in Australia opened in 1882